Epiblema scudderiana, the goldenrod gall moth, is a species of tortricid moth in the family Tortricidae. As their common name suggests, they do feed on and form galls on goldenrod stems. To overwinter the caterpillars line the inside of their galls with silk before going into diapause.

The MONA or Hodges number for Epiblema scudderiana is 3186.

References

Further reading

External links

 

Eucosmini
Moths described in 1860